Odisnel Cooper Despaigne (born March 31, 1992) is a Cuban international footballer.

Club career 
Cooper played for hometown club FC Camaguey in Cuba.  After defecting to the United States in late 2012, Cooper signed with USL club Charleston Battery along with fellow Cuban defectors Maikel Chang and Heviel Cordovés in 2013. When Cooper first arrived in Charleston, the club discovered that he was legally blind when playing without glasses. After securing a pair of contact lenses, Cooper earned the Battery's starting position in goal where he has remained through the 2015 season, when he was named the club's player of the year. The club re-signed him for the 2018 season.

International career 
Cooper made his international debut for Cuba in a December 2011 friendly match against Costa Rica and has earned a total of 7 caps in 2011 and 2012. He represented his country in 3 FIFA World Cup qualifying matches.

His final international was a September 2012 World Cup qualification match against Honduras. He defected with teammates Cordovés and Chang to the United States in October 2012 after leaving the national team in Toronto prior to a World Cup qualifier versus Canada.

References

External links

1992 births
Living people
Sportspeople from Camagüey
Defecting Cuban footballers
Association football goalkeepers
Cuban footballers
Cuba international footballers
Cuba youth international footballers
Footballers at the 2011 Pan American Games
Pan American Games competitors for Cuba
FC Camagüey players
Charleston Battery players
Cuban expatriate footballers
Cuban expatriate sportspeople in the United States
Expatriate soccer players in the United States
USL Championship players